Danny Strong  is an American actor, film and television writer, director, and producer. As an actor, Strong is best known for his roles as Jonathan Levinson in Buffy the Vampire Slayer and Doyle McMaster in Gilmore Girls. He also wrote the screenplays for Recount, the HBO adaptation Game Change, Lee Daniels' The Butler, and co-wrote the two-part finale of The Hunger Games film trilogy, Mockingjay – Part 1 and Mockingjay – Part 2. Strong also is a co-creator, executive producer, director, and writer for the Fox series Empire and created, wrote and directed the award-winning Hulu miniseries Dopesick.

Strong has won two Emmy Awards, two Writers Guild of America Awards, a Producers Guild of America Award, two Peabody Awards and an NAACP Image Award.

Early life
Strong grew up a Jewish family of Lithuanian, Russian, and Polish origin. He began acting at a young age. As a child, Strong rented videos from Video Archives and became friends with Quentin Tarantino, who worked there as a clerk. "I would just literally sit and chat with him for 45 minutes, an hour at a time about movies, and he got me turned on to all these different movies that 10-year-olds don't see." By the time he was 10, Strong became more infatuated with the world of film and was sending his photo to agents.

Strong attended Mira Costa High School, and then studied film and theatre at the University of Southern California.

Career

Acting
Strong is known for playing Jonathan Levinson on the television series Buffy the Vampire Slayer and Paris Geller's boyfriend Doyle McMaster on Gilmore Girls, but he has also appeared in films such as Pleasantville, Dangerous Minds, Seabiscuit, the spoof Shriek If You Know What I Did Last Friday the Thirteenth, and was in the film Sydney White as the Grumpy dork, Gurkin. Strong has also had guest parts in sitcoms such as Seinfeld, Clueless, 3rd Rock from the Sun, Over the Top, Grey's Anatomy, Boy Meets World and How I Met Your Mother and has also guest-lectured in acting classes on finding a job as an actor. In the popular AMC series Mad Men he played Danny Siegel, a young man with no talent, trying to break into the advertising industry, later making a career in Hollywood. Strong also appeared on the HBO series Girls in the third and fourth seasons; and appeared on the fifth and sixth seasons of Justified as Albert Fekus, a rapist prison guard. He is currently starring in Billions as Todd Krakow, Secretary of the Treasury. Strong was set to appear in Once Upon a Time in Hollywood as Dean Martin. However, his scenes were cut from the film.

Writing
At 25, in the hopes of being the lead actor in his own film, Strong wrote a dark comedy about two men who kill an elderly man for his rent-controlled apartment.  The film never materialized, but it sparked his desire to become a full-time writer.  His first successful script was Recount, a film about the 2000 US Elections, produced by HBO and directed by Jay Roach. The film starred Kevin Spacey, Laura Dern, Denis Leary, John Hurt and Tom Wilkinson and premiered on May 25, 2008. The script had been voted number one on the 2007 Hollywood Black List, a list of the "most liked" but unproduced scripts as voted on by the Hollywood community and insiders. Strong was nominated for a 2008 Emmy Award for Primetime Emmy Award for Outstanding Writing for a Miniseries, Movie or a Dramatic Special for Recount. The film was nominated for Best Television Miniseries or Film at the 66th Golden Globe Awards and won a Primetime Emmy Award for Outstanding Made for Television Movie as well as the Writers Guild of America Award for Best Original Screenplay for a Television movie.

Strong followed up Recount with the 2012 film adaptation of Game Change, based on the book written by John Heilemann and Mark Halperin. The film starred Julianne Moore and aired on HBO on March 10, 2012. In 2012, he won a Primetime Emmy Award for Outstanding Writing for a Miniseries, Movie or a Dramatic Special for Game Change. The film was also awarded a Peabody Award, which recognizes distinguished and meritorious public service by radio and television stations, networks, producing organizations and individuals.

In February 2012, he was hired to write the screenplay for the film adaptation of Dan Brown's The Lost Symbol, whose production has been stalled since 2013.

Strong wrote the screenplay for the film The Butler. Oprah Winfrey and Forest Whitaker starred in the film and it was directed by Lee Daniels. The script was voted onto the 2010 Hollywood Black List. It was released in August 2013 and grossed over $100 million in the US box office. He also had a cameo in the film.

In December 2013, Strong signed on to pen the new screenplay for the film adaptation of the musical Guys and Dolls, which originally premiered on Broadway in 1950.

Strong also co-created the TV series Empire with Daniels in 2014, for which he has written and directed multiple episodes.

Strong co-wrote the two-part Mockingjay, the finale of The Hunger Games series. Part 1 was released on November 21, 2014, and Part 2 was released on November 20, 2015.

In October 2021, Strong released Dopesick, a Hulu exclusive miniseries exploring the Sackler family and Purdue Pharma's role in America's opioid crisis. The series was influenced by Beth Macy's book by the same name and starred Michael Keaton, who earned a SAG award for his performance. The critically acclaimed show was nominated for 14 Emmy Awards and won the Peabody Award along with many other awards and honors.

Directing
Strong made his directorial debut with the biographical film on the life of author J. D. Salinger, Rebel in the Rye. The film premiered at the 2017 Sundance Film Festival and was distributed by IFC Films. He followed this up by directing the last two episodes of the award winning limited series Dopesick for he which he was nominated for a Primetime Emmy Award and a Directors Guild Award for Best Director of a Limited Series. He has also directed several episodes of Empire.

Personal life
Strong became engaged to actress Caitlin Mehner on December 29, 2016, in Hawaii after meeting her three years earlier.

Awards and nominations

References

External links

20th-century American male actors
21st-century American male actors
21st-century American screenwriters
Actors from Manhattan Beach, California
American male film actors
American male screenwriters
American male television actors
American male voice actors
American people of Lithuanian-Jewish descent
American people of Polish-Jewish descent
American people of Russian-Jewish descent
Empire (2015 TV series)
Jewish American male actors
Jewish American writers
Living people
American male television writers
Primetime Emmy Award winners
Screenwriters from California
Showrunners
USC School of Dramatic Arts alumni
Writers Guild of America Award winners
Mira Costa High School alumni
Year of birth missing (living people)